George Alexander Whittaker (born 6 December 1981) is a former British rower.

Profile
Whilst in education at Abingdon School he gained colours for the Abingdon School Boat Club. After leaving Abingdon in 1999 he attended the University of London followed by Imperial College London and Oriel College, Oxford.

Rowing
Whittaker came to prominence in 2007 after he won the prestigious Scullers Head of the River Race representing Imperial College at the time. Following this he started rowing for the Oriel College Boat Club and in 2011 secured the number seven seat  in the Oxford dark blue boat at the world renowned Boat Race finishing on the winning side.

See also
 List of Old Abingdonians

References

1981 births
Living people
People educated at Abingdon School
British male rowers
English male rowers